Indru Mudhal is a 2003 Indian Tamil-language romantic drama film written and directed by M. A. Murugesh. The film stars Mithun, Daisy Bopanna and Nanditha, while Nagesh and K. S. Ravikumar also appear in supporting roles. The film was released on 1 May 2003.

Cast

Production
The film marked the directorial debut of M. A. Murugesh, who had previously worked as an apprentice under director K. S. Ravikumar. The shoot of the film was held at locations including the VGP Golden Beach resort in Chennai, as well as Kodaikanal and Gujarat, where they shot scenes depicting the 2001 Gujarat earthquake. Further scenes were shot depicting a cycle race featuring 200 young people, while the climax was filmed on a large ship, the N. N. Cauveri.

Soundtrack
The film's score and soundtrack were composed by Deva, with lyrics written by Pa. Vijay. It featured the songs:

Release
The film had a low profile release on 1 May 2003. Film critic Balaji Balasubramaniam wrote "whatever the director's faults, he cannot be faulted with a lack of imagination" and that he does well "to make the movie a marginally entertaining one". The film did not perform well at the box office.

References

2003 films
2000s Tamil-language films
2003 romantic drama films
Indian romantic drama films
Films shot in Kodaikanal
Films shot in Gujarat
Films shot in Chennai
Films scored by Deva (composer)
2003 directorial debut films